Glenroe was a television drama series broadcast on RTÉ One in Ireland between September 1983, when the first episode was aired, and May 2001. A spin-off from Bracken — a short-lived RTÉ drama itself spun off from The Riordans — Glenroe was broadcast, generally from September to May, each Sunday night at 8:30 pm. It was created, and written for much of its run, by Wesley Burrowes, and later by various other directors and producers including Paul Cusack, Alan Robinson and Tommy McCardle. Glenroe was the first show to be subtitled by RTÉ, with a broadcast in 1991 starting the station's subtitling policy.

Glenroe centred on the lives of the people living in the fictional rural village of the same name in County Wicklow. The real-life village of Kilcoole was used to film the series. The series was also filmed in studio at RTÉ and in various other locations when directors saw fit.

The main protagonists were the Byrne and McDermott/Moran families, related by the marriage of Miley Byrne to Biddy McDermott. Other important characters included Teasy McDaid, the proprietor of the local pub; Tim Devereux and George Black (the Roman Catholic priest and the Church of Ireland Rector of the village respectively); Fidelma Kelly, a cousin of Biddy; Blackie Connors; George Manning; and Stephen Brennan. Dylan D'Arcy, renowned Button accordionist from Kilcoole, Co Wicklow, had a passing role as a child.

Title sequence

Imagery
Glenroe was noted for its original title sequence, which featured the words "Gleann Rua" in Gaelic script morphing into "Glenroe" over a series of rural images. The original title sequence was used from the 1983/84 series to the end of the 1992/93 series, and was replaced with a more up-to-date title sequence at the start of the 1993/94 series.

Jarlath Hayes (1924–2001), master Irish typographer and designer, "who gave his best years as a man of letters working within Irish publishing…drew his own type, Tuam Uncial…it became familiar to a generation of Glenroe viewers on RTÉ television where it featured in the credits".

Theme tune
Glenroes theme tune was that of a traditional Irish song called "Cuaichín Ghleann Néifinn" and was arranged by Jim Lockhart of Horslips. The original version was used from the 1983/84 series to the end of the 1992/93 series. A newly recorded version, arranged by Máire Ní Bhraonáin of Clannad, was introduced with the start of the 1993/94 series, along with changes to the title sequence.

Setting and characters
The central focus of Glenroe is the fictional rural area of the programme's title, located in County Wicklow. The setting is an area consisting of a collection of farms, small village, period house and other rural locations. The programme focuses on a cast of characters living near the village. The main characters are Miley Byrne and Biddy McDermott, whose courtship and marriage form the centerpiece of the action during the early years. Their parents also feature heavily in the storylines. Miley's father Dinny Byrne is a chancer and Biddy's mother, who has been widowed early in the series, conducts a long-running relationship with Dick Moran, the local solicitor. Dick occasionally has other affairs, such as that with Terry Kileen. A number of themes are explored throughout the series from relationships, facing tragedy and other life challenges. While the main theme is drama, there are elements of comedy evident, e.g. the interactions between two central characters of Miley Byrne and his father Dinny Byrne (continuing their character portrayals from Bracken).

Origins
Glenroe, as a story, had origins in two previous shows, The Riordans and Bracken. The three productions were the brainchildren of Wesley Burrowes.

Narratives

Affairs of the heart
Michael Judge, Irish playwright who wrote scripts for Glenroe, published Glenroe: Stories from the RTÉ series created by Wesley Burrowes through Gill & MacMillan in 1990. The book relays the intricate relational beginnings of what would become the soap's linear storyline which would span 18 years. In the beginning two contrasting storylines of the amorous kind were present: that of the wholesome Biddy and Miley, contrasted with the risqué Mary and Dick.

The blow-ins, as they are referred to by the book, are the Byrnes, who arrive in Glenroe from the mountains. The character of Biddy is central to the story. Her parents, Mary and Michael MacDermott, are married and dissimilar in age bracket. Biddy becomes interested in one of the blow-ins. Biddy's first comment on Miley is "he looked a bit of a gom".

The relationship between Dick and Mary emerges as they have a secret love affair, Mary being frustrated in her relationship with Michael MacDermott whom she married out of obligation. The love affair would blossom through secret getaways, with the couple once trying to arrange to be together under the guise of getting away to a Bridge Congress. In the book, when Michael discovers his wife is having an affair, he strikes her.

Religion
The subject of religion featured in the programme throughout the series. One storyline showed how Miley, a devout Roman Catholic, believed his daughter, who had been critically ill with meningitis, was saved by prayer and divine intervention, while Biddy, who rarely went to Mass, credited the doctor with her recovery. The parish priest, Father Tim Devereaux, was upset that nobody was listening to his pastoral advice, and retired to embark on a round-the-world cruise with Shirley Manning, a widow of Protestant and Jewish ancestry.

Another storyline evoked the question: How much money should be spent on a First Communion dress?

Travelling community
In the fourteenth season, Tommy McArdle, the show's producer, began to explore the topic of Irish Travellers in greater depth. However, the topic had not been absent from the programme before this. The character of Blackie Conors is a member of the Irish travelling community.

Another narrative which revolved around the topic of the Travelling community is Miley and Biddy trying to evict a family of travellers who park their caravan on the edge of the farm. When two pet rabbits disappear, the community suspects the travellers have eaten them.

In a later episode, Anne Synnot reveals to her daughter Aileen that she is the product of her mother's affair with a Traveller. Previous to this revelation, Aileen was shown in conversation with Joseph Timlin at the bar in the Molly Malone, using the derogatory term "knacker" referring to the character Francie Donnelly.

Cancellation
In 2000, it seemed the soap was going into inevitable decline. If the actors who played the main characters and whose appearance and likeness were so intrinsic to the beginnings and the storyline of the soap were leaving, it would cease to be Glenroe.
Through a press release the public learned in May 2000 that Joe Lynch, who played Dinny, was to leave. Kevin O'Sullivan wrote, "RTÉ last night confirmed his departure after 20 years, taking into account Glenroe from its beginning and its precursor Bracken. 'No reason was given.' A statement said the 75-year-old actor had made the decision."

On 19 January 2001, despite claims four years previously that it could run for another ten years, RTÉ announced that Glenroe was to end after eighteen series. The final episode of the soap was to be broadcast the following May. The RTÉ Director of Television, Cathal Goan, said it had been clear for some time that Glenroe was "coming to the end of its natural life". In 1 August of that year, Joe Lynch, who played Dinny, died at the age of 76.

The character of Biddy had been killed off in a car accident, and the actor Joe Lynch had died. The Irish Times published irreverent, tongue-in cheek-headlines about the ending of a soap and characters who were fair game for mockery and satire.

John Boland, in the Irish Independent in 2001, criticised the RTÉ Guide'''s coverage and lack of critique or analysis about the end of Glenroe: "a supposedly loved friend was expiring after 18 years and you're supposed to feel something about that, aren't you? Then you realised that the programme had been expiring for years and years, and that this final death throe was merely embarrassing in its lateness."

Wesley Burrowes in his article for The Irish Times's Arts section on 27 January 2001, discussed the beginnings of Glenroe as a story. This started with The Riordans, after which RTÉ asked Burrowes to write a spin-off which became Bracken, and then on to Glenroe where the characters Miley and Dinny Byrne were carried forward to the slightly more urban setting of Glenroe (set in Kilkoole, Wicklow).  Glenroe evolved around Miley and Biddy's love affair, with Miley admiring Biddy for her farming expertise.

Burrowes articulated the problems around the decline of the series, explaining how both ratings and frequency were both guiding factors in the show's ascent and then demise. He drew correlations between Coronation Street and EastEnders, which both competed for frequency and ratings at the BBC, and then explained "the more often a programme appears in a week. the higher its rating goes... Glenroe has been left as the only soap in the archipelago struggling along on one slot a week".

After Burrowes left the crew of Glenroe, he returned to write one New Year's episode, having been asked to do so by Paul Cusack, the show's successive producer. He concluded his piece in The Irish Times's Arts section: "let there be no whinging or moaning at the bar for Glenroe, which, for 18 years, gave good neighbours to a generation. All who were part of that have cause for pride!"

The last episode of Glenroe was transmitted on 6 May 2001, attracting an audience of 591,000 viewers. Its place in the Sunday evening schedule was taken by On Home Ground, a drama series set at a fictional rural GAA club, which ran for two seasons from September 2001 until May 2003.

Geraldine Plunkett starred in the first two seasons of The Clinic, which ran for seven seasons also on Sunday nights. Actor Mick Lally went on to join the cast of the TG4 drama series Ros na Rún in 2008.

Mary McEvoy continues to be a proactive campaigner and actor.

 Music 

In Glenroe, the book, when Miley gets a delivery of a parcel and is asked about the contents, the following exchange takes place:

A song from the series, "The By-road to Glenroe", performed in character by Mick Lally, was released as a single in Ireland in 1990, featuring the Jim Lockhart version of the theme tune as its B-side, and reached number 1 in the Irish Singles Chart on 5 April 1990.

During the late 1990s, new characters were introduced including a character called Paudie, who started a band. They practiced in the local parish hall, and were visited by Fr. Tracey on occasion. The band, made up of the characters Paudie Doyle, Aileen Synnot, Joseph Timlin, Catherine Daly, and Deirdre Cooney, performed in The Molly Malone bar, shot on location in RTÉ, in a Christmas episode in the late 90s. Singer Honor Heffernan sang in this episode. The song performed by the band of youths was written by David Boyd, who played Paudie Doyle, and contained the lyrics: "When the love is real, that's the way it feels | You know the Music's louder, you know the air is sweet, and you can't stop from dancing every time you move your feet, cos when the love is real, that's the way it feels…you can smile on the inside." The character Paudie played the keyboard in the band. The character Aileen Synnot played the guitar surrounded by singing bandmates in one episode, which showed band practice being interrupted by Fr. Tracey.

Political quotes
The last decade of the 20th century, and the first two decades of the 21st century, were significant times in Ireland. Glenroe has cropped up in Dáil debates over these years, as politicians have seen it as an Irish cultural icon which was broadcast through the influential medium of television.

In 1993 Proinsias De Rossa and John Deasy mentioned Glenroe in a discussion about the quality and content of Irish-made TV drama.

In 1998 Michael Ring, speaking about the influence of television on young people, said, "it is important that we keep control of Irish airwaves. It is fine to see Sky television available, but it must be controlled."

In January 2003, almost two years after the cessation of Glenroe, Irish Actors Equity made a presentation in the Joint Committee on Social and Family Affairs Debate. Robert Carrickford, actor and member of the executive committee of Irish Actors Equity was present. Attendees discussed the precarious nature of the acting profession.
Willie Penrose, who chaired the meeting, said;

The first thing I wish to do is dispel the myth surrounding the profession. There is a perception that everybody is doing well. I also come from a profession that suffers from the same syndrome. The top 10% in my profession might be doing extremely well, 40% just about survive and the other 50% are struggling. Perhaps the percentages are different in our guests' profession, but it is easy for it to become a media-led view that everybody is very well off and it is all glamour and glitz.

Michael Ring, at the same meeting, said, "Politicians are like actors... We cannot have just anybody telling social welfare services that they are an actor. There are many good actors out there that we have to deal with and judge every single day. Some of them would do well if they were on Glenroe and they would be well able to convince people they were in the profession."

Later that year Paul Kehoe lamented the lack of choice for Irish viewers since the demise of Glenroe: "Not enough programmes such as Fair City are being made in Ireland. Since Glenroe was cancelled, people are obliged to watch EastEnders, Neighbours, Coronation Street or whatever."

UK Broadcast
Glenroe was screened on 13 of the 15 ITV regional franchises, with most starting to screen the series twice weekly from June 1984 until summer 1985.  Central and LWT never screening the series, STV dropped the series by end of the summer of 1984, while Border continued until 1986.  UTV screened continued to screen the full series.

In December 1995, as part of a soap opera-themed weekend, Channel 4 broadcast an episode of Glenroe.

Glenroe was also shown on the Tara Television network in the United Kingdom via cable and SkyDigital from 1997 to the closure of the station in 2002. Classic episodes were shown in the daytime and repeated in the early evenings on weekdays, and current episodes were simulcast with RTÉ on Sunday evenings during each season. Tara had reached the 1992/93 season of Glenroe at the time of the station's closure.

AdvertisingGlenroe was intersected halfway through by advertisements and was very much an advertisers' medium, cushioning big brand advertisements at the peak time of Sunday evening. Glenroe reached an even wider audience after being picked up and shown further afield on cable TV. Glenroe, in its totality, is an advertisement in itself, for Ireland, for "Irishness" or perhaps for an Ireland that once was. Michael Ring, politician, recently talked about an Internet TV channel – Irish TV – which sells/promotes/advertises Ireland.

Glenroe was the subject of controversy with regard to actors' rights to avail of other commercial work during their contracted periods with the broadcaster. In 1990 RTÉ prohibited soap actors from portraying their characters for advertising purposes. The Irish Times ran an article titled "RTÉ forbids 'soap star' ads." It read: "Actors in RTÉ soap operas such as Glenroe and Fair City will be prevented from portraying well-known characters... for advertising purposes this year... In effect the ban will mean that actors such as Mick Lally and Joe Lynch will be free to earn money from advertisements and from supermarket openings as longs as they do not portray the characters they play in the Glenroe series."

Three days previous another article stated: "the matter was resolved... The Characters are the property of RTÉ".

Cable television – the digital dawn
In 1995 RTÉ made a ten-year deal with a company called Celtic Vision, which according to its Dundalk-born founder Robert Mathews, "should be seen as "a 24-hour 'infomercial' for all things Irish" which can boost Irish-American trade, increase the numbers of American tourists visiting Ireland and move the US vision of Ireland away from shamrocks and leprachauns towards a more realistic representation of the modern Ireland ... The Late Late, which the company has secured as part of a 10-year deal with RTÉ, is now a highlight of the CelticVision schedule and runs alongside Glenroe, Fair City, and a range of Gaelic sports... Mr Mathews raised $1.5 million... mainly through a number of private placings with private investors in Ireland and the United States."

Through challenges garnering funding in the early days, the company was still in operation in 2000, seemingly dissolving in 2003.

In 1995 in The European, journalist David Short wrote, "Soap operas, first devised by companies such as Proctor & Gamble to sell their products, are now seen everywhere in the world... people... watching everyday people living unnaturally eventful lives - Glenroe in Ireland, Country GP in New Zealand, The Awakening in Singapore, House of Christianshavn in Denmark, Buniyaad in India and Kampos in Cyprus are other examples of the phenomenon."

In 1996, The European wrote about Nova TV, which had a wide European reach. "Europe's most watched channel proportionate to population is Nova TV, controlled by Central European Media Enterprises of the US. Launched two years ago it attracts half of all adult viewers in prime time, and gains a 70 percent share of the goal viewing audience compared with only 23 percent for the state rival ČT1. Nova TV may be Europe's most watched channel, but the most popular program in Europe – again taking population into account – is the Irish soap Glenroe."

In 1998 Raymond Snoddy, once senior editor of The Times, wrote about Tara TV (1996–2002) in Marketing Magazine. Tara TV, which reached a United Kingdom audience, aired both Glenroe and Fair City.

Documentary
In December 2015, RTÉ aired a new documentary on Glenroe called Well Holy God It's Glenroe''. It was the brainchild of RTÉ presenter Bláthnaid Treacy, who appeared in the show as Miley and Biddy's daughter Denise.

Rerun
All 18 seasons of Glenroe were temporarily available on RTE Player at Christmas 2021 to celebrate 60 Years Of Television.

References

Further reading
 Down Down Deeper and Down, Eamonn Sweeney, 2010
 Soap Opera and Social Order:  Glenroe, Fair City and Contemporary Ireland, Dr. Helena Sheehan, Dublin, 31 October 1993
 The Continuing Story of Irish Television Drama: Tracking the Tiger, Dr. Helena Sheehan, Dublin, Four Courts Press, 2004
 The Fair City Production Line: An Examination of Soap Operas potential contribution to the Public Sphere, Edward R. Brennan 01 01 2004
 Lentz, Harris M. Obituaries In The Performing Arts, 2010. [Jefferson, N.C.]: McFarland & Co Inc. Pub, 2011. Print.
 Judge, Michael. Glenroe: stories from the RTÉ series created by Wesley Burrowes Gill & MacMillan, 1990
 Smith, Anthony, Television: An International History Oxford University Press, 1998
 Irish Film and Television Network List of Books on Irish Film
 Petitt, Lance, Screening Ireland: Film and Television Representation Manchester University Press, 2000
 Petitt, Lance,  Screening Ireland Google Books Preview
 Allen, Robert C. To Be Continued : Soap Operas and Global Media Cultures Routledge, 1995
 Geraghty, Christine The Study of Soap Opera Accessed 13 June 2005
 Turner, Graeme Cultural Identity, Soap Narrative, and Reality TV 2005, Sage Publications, accessed 13 June 2005
 Turner, Graeme Understanding Celebrity Sage Publications, accessed 14 June 2015

Viewing
 Beedles, Kathleen Shyness Soap Opera & Story TED x Liverpool YouTube Video, 20 August 2014

Political discussions
 Paul Kehoe, Broadcasting Bill 2003 Wed, 26 Nov 2003
 Michael Ring, Irish Actors' Equity Group: Presentation Tuesday, 28 January 2003
 Michael Ring, Broadcasting and Other Media Bill 01 07 1998
 John Deasy & Proinsias De Rossa Broadcasting Authority Bill 1993 Thursday, 6 May 1993

1983 Irish television series debuts
2001 Irish television series endings
1980s Irish television series
1990s Irish television series
Irish television soap operas
RTÉ original programming